Nyamsürengiin Dagvasüren (born 22 January 1990) is a Mongolian judoka.

He is the bronze medallist of the 2017 Judo Grand Slam Tokyo in the -81 kg category.

References

External links
 

1991 births
Living people
Mongolian male judoka
Asian Games medalists in judo
Judoka at the 2014 Asian Games
Asian Games bronze medalists for Mongolia
Medalists at the 2014 Asian Games
20th-century Mongolian people
21st-century Mongolian people